Ravinia may refer to:

 Ravinia (fly), a genus of flesh flies
 Ravinia, South Dakota, U.S., a town
 Ravinia Festival, a music festival in Highland Park, Illinois, U.S.
 Ravinia station, a Metra railway station in Highland Park, Illinois, U.S.

See also
 
 Ravine (disambiguation)